Renuka Bishnoi (born 1 September 1973) is an Indian politician from Indian National Congress and a member of the Haryana Legislative Assembly. She was elected from Hansi in October 2014 on a Haryana Janhit Congress ticket.

Personal life
She is married to Kuldeep Bishnoi and has 3 children, Bhavya Bishnoi, Chaitanya Bishnoi and Sia Bishnoi.

References

Haryana MLAs 2014–2019
Living people
1973 births
Haryana Janhit Congress politicians
21st-century Indian women politicians
21st-century Indian politicians
Women members of the Haryana Legislative Assembly